Pimlico Academy (formerly Pimlico School) is a mixed-sex education secondary school and sixth form with academy status, located in the Pimlico area of Westminster in London.

History

Conversion to academy
After many years of underperformance, culminating with Ofsted's decision to place the school in special measures and the resignation of former head teacher Phil Barnard in December 2006, Westminster council controversially voted in March 2008 to transform Pimlico into an academy. This decision was contrary to consistent expression from the school's stakeholders (teachers, students and parents) that they wanted the school to remain a community school. The Westminster NUT voted in favour of strike action to express their objections to Westminster council's strategy. Staff, students, parents and former school governors held the view that the school's underperformance was due to long-term neglect by Westminster council. During the process of Pimlico's change to an academy, the council argued that the borough's community education needs could be sufficiently served by preserving the existing community school status of Quintin Kynaston School. However, since then QK switched to a community foundation school, meaning that there were no longer any community schools in Westminster akin to the traditional inner-city comprehensive.

The charity Future, set up by John and Caroline Nash, was chosen as the academy’s sponsor in 2008. The chair of the trust, Nash was Parliamentary Under-Secretary of State for School System from January 2013 until September 2017.
In 2010 the school received a Grade 1 ‘Outstanding’ rating from Ofsted. No further full inspection has been undertaken since.

In 2015, a freedom of information request revealed that Pimlico Academy, Paddington Academy and Westminster Academy were given £2 million of extra non-refundable funding to balance their budgets, 3 of 22 nationally sharing £12.6 million. Pimlico deficit funding between 2011 and 2013, was £1 million: schools are not allowed to run a deficit budget.

Primary school controversy

In 2013 Labour councillors called for an inquiry after the new Pimlico primary school where Nash was co-chairman of the governors appointed an unqualified teacher as headmistress ahead of its opening with 60 pupils in September. Further criticism followed when she resigned after four weeks in the job.  The school said that the headmistress had successfully set up the school and wished to pursue other opportunities.

Jo Nash controversy
In 2016, discussing issues raised by deregulation of the education sector, the National Union of Teachers cited Future Academies after Nash's daughter Jo, unqualified as a teacher, was given an unpaid teaching position at Pimlico Academy. An Oxford University history graduate, Jo Nash had previously worked in the office of the Tory minister Iain Duncan Smith; she joined Future as an unqualified teacher and as an adviser to help design the trust's history curriculum and recruit teachers.

Student, staff and parent protests
Daniel Smith, formerly a deputy at Ebbsfleet Academy, who was appointed headteacher in September 2020, made a series of unpopular changes to the school ethos, syllabus and uniform code and flew a Union Flag in the grounds, which some opposed.

Students expressed concern that the school's revised syllabus taught too little about Black history and that a strict appearance policy banning colourful hijabs and hairstyles which "block the view of others" was racist.

The students signed a petition of no confidence in Smith's leadership, and one member of staff referred to the matter in a resignation letter. Parents said that the changes did not reflect the education they had chosen for their children.

By March 2021, relations between staff and leading trust members were said to have deteriorated, resulting in protests in which students tore down and burned the Union flag. A slogan was painted reading: "there is no black in the Union Jack".

On 31 March, students staged a protest (which was falsely said to be a walkout) and gathered in the playground with those parents and teachers who supported them. The trust's chief executive, the headteacher and the vice principal met representatives of the students and agreed to all their demands. When Smith addressed the staff, the following day, he said he was using the Easter break to reflect on the changes: there were cries of "Leave". It was revealed that in the no-confidence vote, 85 members of staff had voted for the motion which resulted in a 99% vote of no-confidence, and 98% had voted to proceed to industrial action.

To start the new term, Smith issued letters to students involved in the protest threatening them with expulsion. This followed a warning letter sent out to all parents, by Lord Nash, Chair of Future Academies the previous Wednesday: "We must particularly ensure that our students, your children, understand the consequences of any future disobedience, which will undoubtedly result in disciplinary action."

'They want to expel the students for speaking out' and 'Expel the Racist Headmaster' were graffitied in support of the students on the wall on Sunday night.

Several MPs wrote a letter to the headteacher on 19 April, expressing their concern about possible action against children who had taken part in the protest.

Sir Michael Wilshaw, the former chief inspector of schools in England (2012-2016), was drafted in by Future Academies to support Smith.

Smith announced his resignation on 18 May 2021. He is replaced by Tony Oulton, effective 31 May.

Buildings

The school was rebuilt between 2008 and 2011 to a design by Architecture PLB as part of the Building Schools for the Future initiative. The design was for a school of total capacity of 1262, that is a Key Stage 3/ Key Stage 4 five form entry secondary school (1050), a 200 place sixth-form and a 12 place special unit. It included a local library and a base for Westminster Adult Education Service. The contract with Westminster City Council was valued at £20m. It was constructed by Bouygues.

Architectural history

The previous school building was designed by John Bancroft of the Greater London Council's architecture department and was built in 1967–70. It was a noted example of brutalist architecture, constructed of concrete and glass without decorative claddings or ornament, and its appearance had been controversial since it opened.  A contemporary critic likened it to a battleship, describing it as a "100-odd metre long, turreted, metallic grey thing lying in its own sunken rectangle".

Over time, deterioration of the building's fabric and drawbacks of its glass construction led to complaints that the building was often excessively hot in the summer and very cold in winter. Council authorities also expressed concern that the building's seventeen exits and entrances made it difficult to secure the site, and that the site lacked disabled access.

In the face of opposition from the Twentieth Century Society, and that of prominent architects and critics including Richard Rogers, RIBA president Sunand Prasad, Stephen Bayley, and John McAslan,  the last remaining part of the old building was demolished in summer 2010.

Notable former pupils

 Tammy Abraham, footballer
 Elisha Carter, chef
 Leo Chambers, footballer, West Ham United F.C.
 Moustafa Chousein-Oglou, actor
 Matthew Freud, public relations executive
 Mo Gilligan, comedian
 Julian Gray, footballer
 Suzanna Hamilton, actress
 Patrick Harrington, politician in the National Front (1979-1989) and currently Third Way (UK)  think-tank. General secretary of Solidarity – The Union for British Workers
 Michael Harvey, Jr (aka Harvey (MC)), musician and actor
 Elly Jackson, member of pop duo La Roux
 Felix Martin, member of the band Hot Chip
 Amy Jenkins,  novelist and screenwriter
 Alan Johnson, Labour Party politician and former Home Secretary.
 Ella Jones, Actor in Queen's Nose
 Graeme Le Saux, footballer for Chelsea and Blackburn Rovers
 Toby Mott, artist and designer.
 Johnny Rogan, author
 Thomas Sangster, actor
 Frank Sinclair, footballer for Chelsea and Leicester City
 Rodney Smith (aka Roots Manuva), musician
 Will Straw, British policy researcher and Labour Party politician
 Abigail Thaw, actor
 Steve Walsh, disc jockey
 Ashley Walters (aka Asher D), musician [So Solid Crew] and actor
 Miles from Kinsasha Musical Artist

Academic and financial performance
As of the 2017/18 academic year, OFSTED rated the school's performance as Outstanding; with the financial balance for the school being reported at -£369.6k on a turnover of £9.7m.

References

External links

 Former Sloane Grammar School
 Official website

Academies in the City of Westminster
Brutalist architecture in London
Buildings and structures in the City of Westminster
Educational institutions established in 2008
2008 in London
2008 establishments in England
Secondary schools in the City of Westminster
Pimlico